Murray Lake may refer to:

Murray Lake (Manitoba)
Murray Lake (Michigan)

See also 
 Lake Murray (disambiguation)